City of Heroes is the second studio album by the melodic rock / heavy metal duet project Kiske/Somerville. The album features the collaboration between vocalist Michael Kiske (Helloween, Unisonic, Place Vendome) and American singer Amanda Somerville (Aina, HDK, Trillium). It was released on 17 April 2015 in Europe and on 21 April 2015 in North America.

The album features Mat Sinner (Primal Fear, Sinner) and Magnus Karlsson (Primal Fear) handling most of the songwriting, with one contribution from Sander Gommans (ex-After Forever) and Amanda Somerville. Veronika Lukesova is in charge of the drumming and Mat Sinner handle the production Jacob Hansen mixed and mastered the album. City of Heroes charted at No. 41 in the official German album charts.

Two music videos were filmed for the songs "City Of Heroes" and "Walk On Water" in Nuremberg, Germany. Joining Kiske and Somerville for the shoot were bassist and composer Mat Sinner, guitarist, keyboardist and composer Magnus Karlsson and drummer Veronika Lukesova. The clips were directed by Martin Mueller.

Track listing

DVD
City of Heroes (official music video)
Walk on Water (official music video)
Making of "City of Heroes" (documentary)

Musicians
Michael Kiske - male lead/backing vocals
Amanda Somerville - female lead/backing vocals
Magnus Karlsson - guitars & keyboards
Mat Sinner - bass & backing vocals
Veronika Lukesova - drums

References

External links
Michael Kiske (Official website)
Amanda Somerville (Official website)
Where Wishes Fly Official Michael Kiske Fanclub (Facebook)
Amanda Somerville (Facebook)

2015 albums
Vocal duet albums
Frontiers Records albums
Kiske/Somerville albums